Allium hymenorhizum is a Eurasian species of wild onion in the amaryllis family. It grows at elevations of 1100–2700 m

Allium hymenorhizum has bulbs up to 15 mm in diameter. Scape is up to 90 cm tall. Leaves are flat, narrow, less than 6 mm wide but almost as long as the scape. Umbel is densely packed with many red flowers.

Varieties
Varieties include:
 Allium hymenorhizum var. dentatum J.M.Xu - Xinjiang
 Allium hymenorhizum var. hymenorhizum - European Russia, Altay Krai, Kazakhstan, Kyrgyzstan, Tajikistan, Iran, Afghanistan, Turkey, Xinjiang, Mongolia

Formerly included
Allium hymenorhizum var. tianschanicum (Rupr.) Regel, now called Allium tianschanicum Rupr.

References

hymenorhizum
Onions
Flora of Turkey
Flora of Iran
Flora of Afghanistan
Flora of Central Asia
Flora of East European Russia
Flora of Altai (region)
Flora of Xinjiang
Flora of Mongolia
Plants described in 1830